Dacia Stadium is a multi-use stadium in Orăştie, Hunedoara County. It is currently the home ground of Dacia Orăştie. It can currently hold 978 seats.

Football venues in Romania
Buildings and structures in Hunedoara County
Orăștie